Tahifet is a village in the commune of Tamanrasset, in Tamanrasset District, Tamanrasset Province, Algeria.

References

Neighbouring towns and cities

Populated places in Tamanrasset Province